Tricouni Southwest is a basaltic andesite lava flow in the Mount Cayley volcanic field of the Garibaldi Volcanic Belt in southwestern British Columbia, Canada, located south of Tricouni Peak.

See also
Volcanism of Canada
Volcanism of Western Canada

References

Holocene volcanism
Mount Cayley volcanic field